Dashnor Bajaziti (born 4 January 1955) is a former Albanian footballer who played as a striker for Besa Kavajë and the Albania National Football Team. He was a two-time top scorer of the Albanian Superliga.

International career
He made his debut for Albania in a September 1980 FIFA World Cup qualification win at home over Finland and earned a total of 5 caps, scoring no goals. His final international was a March 1983 European Championship qualification match against West Germany.

Managerial career
After his playing career, Bajaziti served as Besa head coach from 1985–1988.

Political career
He was Albania's Deputy Minister of Tourism, Culture, Youth and Sports for the Republican Party of Albania. In May 2013 he was dismissed by party leader Fatmir Mediu due to internal conflicts.

Personal life
His son, Darlien Bajaziti is also a football player.

References

External links

1955 births
Living people
Footballers from Kavajë
Albanian footballers
Association football forwards
Albania international footballers
Besa Kavajë players
Albanian football managers
Besa Kavajë managers
21st-century Albanian politicians